This was the first edition of the tournament.

Hugo Grenier won the title after defeating Hiroki Moriya 6–2, 6–3 in the final.

Seeds

Draw

Finals

Top half

Bottom half

References

External links
Main draw
Qualifying draw

Open International de Tennis de Roanne - 1